Thomas Parr may refer to:
Old Tom Parr (reputedly 1483–1635), English supercentenarian who claimed to have lived for 152 years
Thomas Parr (MP for Westmorland) (1407–1461); English landowner, MP and under-sheriff of Westmorland
Thomas Parr (died 1517) (–1517), English courtier and father of Queen Katherine Parr
Thomas Parr (of Bencoolen) (died 1807), British resident in Bencoolen, commemorated in the Thomas Parr Monument
Thomas Johannes Lauritz Parr (1862-1935), Norwegian educator
Thomas Parr (slave trader), (1769-1847), English slave trader